Cochin University of Science and Technology (CUSAT) is a government owned autonomous university in Kochi (Cochin), Kerala, India. CUSAT is academically structured into 9 faculties: engineering, environmental studies, humanities, law, marine sciences, medical sciences and technology, science, social sciences and technology. It has 27 departments offering graduate and post graduate programmes as well as research in different disciplines like engineering, science, technology, humanities, law and management. Various centres for specialised areas is established by the university aiming multi-disciplinary interaction. Apart from these there are many government and non-government institutions affiliated with CUSAT.

Recognised Institutions

Research Centres

See also
Cochin University of Science and Technology

References

External links 
 KEAM 2012 prospectus
 Engineering Colleges under IHRD
 Engineering Colleges in Kerala
 Engineering Colleges under CAPE
 Recognised Institutions under CUSAT
 Research Centres affiliated to CUSAT

Lists of universities and colleges in Kerala
Universities and colleges in Kochi
Lists of colleges affiliated to universities in India
Kochi-related lists
Affiliates